Ancinidae is a family of isopods belonging to the order Isopoda.

Genera:
 Ancinus Milne Edwards, 1840
 Bathycopea Tattersall, 1905

References

Isopoda
Crustacean families